Lake Clay, on the north edge of Lake Placid, Florida, has a surface area of . Lake Clay is almost completely surrounded by residences. Only a few small grassy undeveloped areas exist around the lake.

Lake Clay has public access at two public boat ramps. One is on the east side of the lake, at 1650 Lake Clay Drive, and the other is on the west side, at 1300 Lake Clay Drive. Lake Clay Drive surrounds three-fourths of Lake Clay. The lake has no public swimming beach.  There is no information about the types of fish in the lake available.

References

Clay
Clay